Charles Perrat (14 January 1899, Lyon – 4 July 1976) was a 20th-century French paleographer, professor at the École Nationale des Chartes. An archivist, he was also a member of the Société des Antiquaires de France.

Sources 
 Francois (Michel), « Charles Perrat (1899-1976) », Bibliothèque de l'école des chartes, 136 (1978), p. 449-455 online
 François (Martine), « PERRAT Charles Claude Jacques », notice de l'annuaire du CTHS online

External links 
 Charles Perrat on data.bnf.fr

Academic staff of the École Nationale des Chartes
French archivists
French palaeographers
Scientists from Lyon
1899 births
1976 deaths